Vic Lee may refer to:
 Vic Lee, the owner of Vic Lee Racing
 Vic Lee (journalist) (born 1946), TV reporter in the San Francisco Bay Area

See also
Victor Li Tzar-kuoi (born 1964), Hong Kong-Canadian businessman